N'zeto Airport  is an airport serving N'zeto, a town in Zaire Province, Angola.

See also

 List of airports in Angola
 Transport in Angola

References

External links 
OpenStreetMap - N'zeto
OurAirports - N'zeto

Airports in Angola